International men's cricket was first played in Ireland in 1855 by a Gentlemen of England team, although it would not be until 1888 that the first tour by a team termed as representative was made by Scotland. The first Test match to be played in Ireland came 120 years later in 2018 between Ireland and Pakistan at Malahide. The first One Day International to be held in Ireland came in the 1999 Cricket World Cup between Bangladesh and the West Indies at Castle Avenue, Dublin. In 2008, the Stormont in Belfast hosted the first Twenty20 International to be played in Ireland during the 2008 ICC World Twenty20 Qualifier, with Canada playing the Netherlands.

Men's international grounds

Active venues
Below is a complete list of grounds used for men's international cricket in Ireland, listed in order of first use.

See also
List of cricket grounds in Ireland

Notes

References

Cricket grounds in Ireland
Cricket grounds in Northern Ireland